The American Elm cultivar Ulmus americana 'Washington', of unknown derivation, was sourced from Princeton Nurseries, Princeton, New Jersey, from 1985, and planted on the National Mall, Washington D.C. It was then selected by H. V. Wester of the U. S. National Park Service and introduced for trials as NPS 3-178. Santamour pointed out that as the historic Washington Elm had been propagated as 'Washington', NPS 3-178, if ever registered as a cultivar, would need a different cultivar name.

Description
The tree has been described as possibly having triploid chromosome levels (unusual for an American Elm), suggesting it may be a hybrid between the tetraploid and rarer diploid forms of American Elm, like the cultivar 'Jefferson'.

Pests and diseases
The tree is resistant to Dutch elm disease, but less so than other contemporaneous American Elm cultivars such as 'Valley Forge'. Like all other American Elm cultivars, it is also susceptible to Elm Yellows. No other specific information available, but the species generally is also moderately preferred for feeding and reproduction by the adult Elm Leaf Beetle Xanthogaleruca luteola, and highly preferred for feeding by the Japanese Beetle Popillia japonica  in the United States. U. americana is the most susceptible of all the elms to verticillium wilt.

Cultivation
Neither 'Washington' nor 'Jefferson' has been widely tested beyond Washington D.C. The tree is not known to be in commerce, nor known to be in cultivation beyond the United States.

Accessions

North America

Brooklyn Botanic Garden , New York, US. Acc. no. 850233.
Smith College, US. Acc. no. 41703.

External links
http://fletcher.ces.state.nc.us/programs/nursery/metria/metria11/warren/elm.htm Return of the Elm -the status of elms in the nursery industry in 2000. Warren, K., J. Frank Schmidt and Co.

References

American elm cultivar
Ulmus articles missing images
Ulmus